I'm Back may refer to:

 I'm Back (album), a 1998 album by James Brown
 I'm Back (film), a 2018 comedy directed by Luca Miniero
 "I'm Back", a song by Eminem from his album The Marshall Mathers LP
 "I'm Back" (song), a 2010 song by American rapper T.I.
 "I'm Back", a song by Monica from her album All Eyez on Me
 "I'm Back", a song by Ashley Tisdale from her album Guilty Pleasure
 "I'm Back", a song by Slim Thug from his album Boss of All Bosses
 "I'm Back", a song by The Box (1987)
 "I'm Back", a song by The Charmers (1964)
 "I'm Back", a song by Karrier (1984)
 "I'm Back", a song by Little Richard (1966)
 "I'm Back", a song by Sil Austin And His Orchestra (1958)
 "I'm Back", a song by Tommy Faia And The True Blue Facts (1968)
 "I'm Back", a song by Ile Kallio (1982)
 "I'm back", a variant of the Terminator's "I'll be back" phrase

See also
We're Back! (disambiguation)